Hemenahei Island is an island in Papua New Guinea, part of the Calvados Chain within the Louisiade Archipelago. It is located to toward the eastern end of the Calvados Chain, in the Louisiade Archipelago, in the Milne Bay Province, between Pana Tinani (off Vanatinai) in the East and Pana Wina in the West.

It was previously inhabited (Niyalehoi village on the northern coast) but now only occasionally being used as a camp for fishermen who come from Pana Tinani.
Niyalehoi had some gardens for yams and sago, that Sabari Islanders used to crop.

References

Islands of Milne Bay Province
Louisiade Archipelago
Uninhabited islands of Papua New Guinea